Gubernatorial elections were held in Brazil on 5 October 2014 alongside nationwide general elections, with runoff elections held in several states on 26 October.

Results
The Governors elected in 2014 were the following: 
 Acre – Tião Viana from the Workers' Party (re-elected)
 Alagoas – Renan Filho from the Brazilian Democratic Movement Party
 Amapá – Waldez Góes from the Democratic Labour Party
 Amazonas – José Melo from the Republican Party of the Social Order
 Bahia – Rui Costa from the Workers' Party
 Ceará – Camilo Santana from the Workers' Party
 Espírito Santo – Paulo Hartung from the Brazilian Democratic Movement Party
 Federal District – Rodrigo Rollemberg from the Brazilian Socialist Party
 Goiás – Marconi Perillo from the Brazilian Social Democracy Party
 Maranhão – Flávio Dino from the Communist Party of Brazil
 Mato Grosso – Pedro Taques from the PDT
 Mato Grosso do Sul – Reinaldo Azambuja from the Brazilian Social Democracy Party
 Minas Gerais – Fernando Pimentel from the Workers' Party
 Pará – Simão Jatene from the Brazilian Social Democracy Party (re-elected)
 Paraíba – Ricardo Coutinho from the Brazilian Socialist Party (re-elected)
 Paraná – Beto Richa from the Brazilian Social Democracy Party (re-elected)
 Pernambuco – Paulo Câmara from the Brazilian Socialist Party
 Piauí – Wellington Dias from the Workers' Party
 Rio de Janeiro – Luiz Fernando Pezão from the Brazilian Democratic Movement Party
 Rio Grande do Norte – Robinson Faria from the Social Democratic Party
 Rio Grande do Sul – José Ivo Sartori from the Brazilian Democratic Movement Party
 Rondônia – Confúcio Moura from the Brazilian Democratic Movement Party (re-elected)
 Roraima – Suely Campos from the Progressive Party
 Santa Catarina – Raimundo Colombo from the Social Democratic Party (re-elected)
 São Paulo – Geraldo Alckmin from the Brazilian Social Democratic Party (re-elected)
 Sergipe – Jackson Barreto from the Brazilian Democratic Movement Party
 Tocantins – Marcelo Miranda from the Brazilian Democratic Movement Party

References

2014
2014 in Brazil
2014 elections in Brazil